Josef Fischer (1 June 1883 – 28 September 1932) was an Austrian footballer. He played in five matches for the Austria national football team from 1903 to 1910.

References

External links
 

1883 births
1932 deaths
Austrian footballers
Austria international footballers
Place of birth missing
Association footballers not categorized by position